Chhorii is a 2021 Indian Hindi-language horror film directed by Vishal Furia and produced by Bhushan Kumar, Krishan Kumar, Vikram Malhotra, Jack Davis, Shikhaa Sharma and Shiv Chanana. A remake of the Marathi-language film Lapachhapi (2017), the film features Nushrratt Bharuccha in the lead role, alongside Mita Vashisht, Rajesh Jais and Saurabh Goyal. The film premiered on Amazon Prime Video on 26 November 2021.

Plot
In the opening scene, a pregnant woman is chased in a sugarcane field and forced to cut her own womb. The scene cuts to the cityscape, where a woman, Sakshi, works in an NGO and lives with her husband Hemant. They both abscond to their driver's village to hide for some days after Hemant is beaten and threatened by some people for not returning a loan he had borrowed for a business plan.

They reach the village through a sugarcane field and meet the driver's wife Devi, a very orthodox woman. Hemant leaves to find a solution to their financial problems. Sakshi gradually finds a bond with Devi. She meets Rani, Rajbir's (Devi's eldest son) wife, the one who was chased in the first scene. Devi explains that Rani lost her child before the birth and in order to save her, her womb was cut.

Sakshi is teased by three children and grows curious about them. Devi warns her to stay away from them but Sakshi doesn't listen. Devi, frustrated that Sakshi is not listening, threatens her. Things sour between her and Sakshi after this. A few days later, Hemant returns and Sakshi asks him to take her somewhere else in a fit of panic. That night, as they are leaving, the couple is attacked by Devi and a ritual is performed on Sakshi by devi and her husband. Devi takes her back to her room and ties her to the bed.

Devi tells her that she must stay there alone for next three days in order to get rid of Sunaini, Devi's sister-in-law and a ghost, who once was pregnant. She killed Devi's three little boys, her own husband, and then herself by cutting her womb when she was pregnant. Sunaini cursed Devi's family, ensuring they cannot continue their lineage. Devi tells Sakshi that all the visions she will see in the next three days will be illusions. Sakshi tries to escape the house but in vain.

It is revealed that Sunaini was being asked by her in-laws to kill her fetus because of it being a female child. When she refused and tried to escape, she accidentally killed her own husband. Devi's family, thinking Sunaini killed her husband, burned her alive. In the process, she gave birth to her baby but her baby was thrown in the well to fulfill a ritual that guarantees a good harvest. Sunaini, in her burned state, jumps into the well to save her daughter. Devi's three boys, who loved Sunaini, jumped in after her to save them, resulting in all of them dying and becoming ghosts.

Sakshi experiences the ordeal Sunaini went through in a series of harrowing experiences. In the final moments, before being made to self-harm her baby by Sunaini, she makes an oath to tell everyone of the ordeal that Sunaini went through if the ghost lets her go instead of repeating the same torment on the new wives. Sakshi survives the three days and in the morning when Devi, the driver and Hemant come, she refuses to leave without revealing the story.

Hemant is revealed to be Rajbir, who killed his previous two wives because he was afraid they would tell people about the murders in the village. He spared Rani because she swore to stay silent. As Rajbir goes to attack Sakshi from behind, Rani kills him with a cleaver. Sakshi walks away from the village house, through the sugarcane field in the direction given by the three ghost children. She is joined by Rani.

Cast
 Nushrratt Bharuccha as Sakshi Devi
 Mita Vashisht as Bhanno Devi, Kajla's wife
 Pallavi Ajay as Rani : Rajbir's Third Wife
 Yaaneea Bharadwaj as Sunaini
 Rajesh Jais as Kajla
 Saurabh Goyal as Rajbir/Hemant
 Gracy Goswami as Small Girl

Production
The principal photography began on 25 November 2020 in Madhya Pradesh. The film was wrapped up in December 2020.

Reception
It generally received negative reviews from critics and mixed reviews from audiences, praising the performance of Nusrat Bharucha but criticising the horror scenes. However, Rohan Naahar of The Indian Express wrote that though "the film is a surprisingly well-made horror picture that actually respects the genre, but loses its way so tragically in its final moments" and turn it "into a message movie". Concluding the review, Rohan asks a question from director, "Does Furia [(director)] think that potential baby-killers are watching his film? Does he expect Chhorii to change their mind about killing babies?"

Sequel
In December 2021, the sequel Chhorii 2 was officially confirmed by makers of film.

References

External links 
 
 

T-Series (company) films
Indian horror thriller films
Indian pregnancy films
Hindi remakes of Marathi films
Amazon Prime Video original films